Canan Moodie (born 5 November 2002) is a South African rugby union player for the  in the Currie Cup. His regular position is wing.

Moodie was named in the  side for the 2022 Currie Cup Premier Division.

In August 2022, he was included in the Springboks touring squad for away matches against Australia in the Rugby Championship. In his Test debut against Australia in Sydney, Moodie scored a try in the 38th minute.

Honours
 United Rugby Championship runner-up 2021–22

References

External links

Canan Moodie at Blue Bulls

South African rugby union players
Living people
Rugby union wings
Blue Bulls players
2002 births
Bulls (rugby union) players
Rugby union players from the Western Cape
South Africa international rugby union players